The Independent Network (IN) is a United Kingdom-based non-profit organisation supporting independent politicians and political candidates. It is also registered as a political party with the  Electoral Commission in Great Britain and Northern Ireland.

Founded in 2005, the IN consists of supporters and volunteers who advocate non-partisan politics. Former independent MPs Martin Bell and Richard Taylor have been involved. A number of supporters of the IN are current independent representatives in European, national, regional and local governments and independent candidates in local and general elections.

The IN does not impose any political views on the individuals it supports. However, they must be non-discriminatory and adhere to a code of conduct proposed by Bell and endorsed by the IN executive committee.

Organisation
Marianne Overton, Jim Thornton and Karen Lucioni are the organisations leadership, fulfilling the roles of leader, treasurer, nominations officer and campaigns officer. Similarly, these individuals are the registered officers for the political party.The organisation is also registered as a company since 2009. Jim Thornton and Brian Ahearne are the directors.

Supporters
The IN is supported by several notable figures in independent politics, including Martin Bell; Richard Taylor MP; Terry Waite and Esther Rantzen. During the 2005 elections, with the IN's backing, Reg Keys stood against Tony Blair in Blair's own Sedgefield Constituency because of the death of his son in the Iraq War.

In January 2010, Waite sent an open letter to all independent Parliamentary candidates giving them his support and approval. The letter also discusses several problems Waite sees with the Westminster system and British politics in general.

Services

The IN offers services and support to independent candidates free of charge. Services provided include the following:
Administrative and legal assistance for election purposes; independent candidates set up on their own or alternatively register and maintain new political parties.
A list of best practices for campaigning, fundraising, public relations, and appropriate use of the Internet.
Public opinion and policy research.
Organising debates and discussions.
The IN also encourages members to contact one another for advice and guidance, to promote cohesive rather than adversarial politics.

In January 2010, the IN organised a training session on procedure in the UK Parliament for independent PPCs. The event was run by Parliamentary Outreach, a government agency that works to expand the public's knowledge of Parliament. That same month the IN held a workshop in the Birmingham Priory Rooms to instruct PPCs on the electoral process and regulations. Bell, Taylor, Rantzen, and Lynn Faulds Wood attended the event.

In the 2010 election, the IN endorsed independent candidates to provide a quality marker for independent politicians. Endorsed candidates could use the IN logo and branding.

References

External links
 The Independent Network Homepage
 Independent MPs blog
 Guide to Becoming an Independent Candidate

Political organisations based in the United Kingdom
Independent politicians in the United Kingdom
Organizations established in 2005